The 2007 Al Abbas mosque bombing occurred on April 28, 2007 when a suicide car bomb exploded in front of the al-‘Abbās Mosque in Karbala, Iraq.

At least 58 people and injured about 170 in the Iraqi city of Karbala. The bomb exploded near the golden-domed mosque. Karbala is considered the second most important shrine city for the Shia. Security officials said the car bomb was parked near a cement barrier intended to keep traffic away from the Imam Abbas and Imam Husayn shrines, which draw thousands of Shiite pilgrims from Iran and other countries.

See also
2003 Karbala bombings
2007 Karbala bombings
Holy sites in Iraq

References

2007 in Islam
2007 murders in Iraq
Explosions in 2007
Mass murder in 2007
Suicide car and truck bombings in Iraq
Terrorist incidents in Iraq in 2007
Attacks on Shiite mosques
Karbala
Attacks on religious buildings and structures in Iraq
Building bombings in Iraq